Sands Secondary is a public high school in Delta, British Columbia part of School District 37 Delta.

Academics 
Sands Secondary was formerly Sands Junior Secondary with Grades 8-10 until 2005.  With the reconfiguration of three other high schools in North Delta (Delview, Burnsview, and North Delta), Sands Secondary became an 8-12 school. It graduated its first Grade 12 class in June 2006.

Athletics 
Sands has several sports teams, including junior and senior level Volleyball and Basketball teams. In 2009–2010, the Senior Boys Soccer team won the AAA provincials. In 2007–2008, 2009–2010, Sands won the Fraser Valley Badminton Championships. The school also has a Field Hockey team and as of September 2010, features an Ice Hockey team.

System 
Sands Secondary runs on a linear system like other Canadian high schools. It is based on 8 courses separated into four days. For example, if Monday is a day 1 then Tuesday would have to be a day 2. Each day contains 4 blocks numbered ABCDEFGH. Day 1 contains A B C D block, while day 2 contains E F G H. Day 3 contains B A D C block. Day 4 contains F E H G block. Between B and C block there is a 45 min lunch break, as well as F and G block. Due to the Covid-19 pandemic, a new schedule was implemented. The 2020-2021 school year used a quarter system, where students had 2 classes a day. Each course had a 2-hour block, and the school day ended after those two courses. In the 2021-2022 year, a semester system is in effect.

References

External links

School Reports - Ministry of Education
 Satisfaction Survey
 School Performance
 Skills Assessment

High schools in Delta, British Columbia
Educational institutions established in 1974
1975 establishments in British Columbia